Lexington High School is a grade 9-12 high school in Lexington, Tennessee. The school's enrollment is roughly 1,000 students.

Academics

Jackson State Community College offers some AP classes on-campus, as well as off-campus classes, including English Language, English Literature, and Calculus.

Extra-curricular activities

Clubs include Future Farmers of America FFA, Family, Career, and Community Leaders of America FCCLA, Student Council, Air Force JROTC, and Renaissance. LHS also has a marching band, cheerleading squad, dance team, BETA, Tennis, Volleyball, Soccer, Baseball, Football, Basketball, and a yearbook staff.

Sports

Girls' sports include volleyball, golf, basketball, cross country, track, softball, dance team, tennis, and cheerleading.  Boys' sports include golf, football, basketball, soccer, cross country, track & field, tennis, and baseball.

Lexington football team has a tradition of excellence. As recently as 2005, the team finished the regular season undefeated and went on to win their first 12 games of the season before losing to David Lipscomb in the quarterfinals of the 3A playoffs. Also went undefeated in 2011 regular season.

Lexington's golf team won the TSSAA State Championship in 2003. In 2004, the golf team finished 5th at State. In 2005,

Chase Grissom won the TSSAA Individual State Championship.

Maggie Silvers won the TSSAA Cross Country Individual State Championship in 1999.

The Lexington Baseball team won the TSSAA State Championship in 2002. Steve Sweat was player of the year in AA. Jason Patterson was coach of the year in the state for AA.

Notable alumni
Jim Stowe - TSSAA Hall of Fame Coach
Jerry Graves - All-American Basketball Player from 1955–1957, Went on to play at Mississippi State
James D. Todd - US District Court Judge for Western Tennessee 1985-2008.
Stanley Thomas Anderson - US District Court Judge for Western Tennessee 2008–present.
Shane Britt - Junior College Baseball All-American (1994), United States JUCO team that played Japan (1994), Went on to play at the University of South Alabama 1995-1996.
Willie Flakes - First Afro-american president of the student council 1973-1974
Chandler Scott - First Social Worker to graduate from Lexington High School.
Mercedes Owens — First Lexington High School graduate to attend an Ivy League University, the University of Pennsylvania.

References

Public high schools in Tennessee
Schools in Henderson County, Tennessee